Fonissa is a stream in western Corinthia, Peloponnese, Greece. The source of the river is in the hills near the village Rethi. It flows towards the southeast though a narrow gorge, and empties into the Gulf of Corinth between the villages Kato Loutro and Kamari, 6 km northwest of Xylokastro.

Places along the river
Rethi
Dendro
Amfithea
Kato Loutro
Kamari

See also
List of rivers in Greece

References

Landforms of Corinthia
Rivers of Greece
Rivers of Peloponnese (region)
Drainage basins of the Gulf of Corinth